Jackson Township is one of thirteen townships in Tippecanoe County, Indiana, United States. As of the 2010 census, its population was 499 and it contained 185 housing units.

Geography

Unincorporated communities
 Odell at 
(This list is based on USGS data and may include former settlements.)

Adjacent townships
 Wayne Township (north)
 Union Township (northeast)
 Randolph Township (east)
 Coal Creek Township, Montgomery County (south)
 Richland Township, Fountain County (southwest)
 Davis Township, Fountain County (northwest)

Cemeteries
The township contains these three cemeteries: Shelby, Sugar Grove and Wheeler Grove.

School districts
 Tippecanoe School Corporation

Political districts
 Indiana's 4th congressional district
 State House District 41
 State Senate District 22

References
 United States Census Bureau 2007 TIGER/Line Shapefiles
 United States Board on Geographic Names (GNIS)
 United States National Atlas

External links
 Indiana Township Association
 United Township Association of Indiana

Townships in Tippecanoe County, Indiana
Lafayette metropolitan area, Indiana
Townships in Indiana